The 1981 Bordeaux Open also known as the "Grand Prix Passing Shot" was a tennis tournament played on outdoor clay courtss at Villa Primrose in Bordeaux in France that was part of the 1981 Volvo Grand Prix. The tournament was held from 21 September through 26 September 1981. Second-seeded Andrés Gómez won the singles title.

Finals

Singles

 Andrés Gómez defeated  Thierry Tulasne 7–6, 7–6, 6–1
 It was Gómez' first singles title of his career.

Doubles

 Andrés Gómez /  Belus Prajoux defeated  Jim Gurfein /  Anders Järryd 7–5, 6–3

References

External links
 ITF tournament edition details

Bordeaux Open
ATP Bordeaux
Bordeaux Open
Bordeaux Open